The 2022 South Dakota Attorney General election took place on November 8, 2022, to elect the next attorney general of South Dakota. On June 21, 2022, former Republican Attorney General Jason Ravnsborg was convicted and removed from office for malfeasance of office. The State Senate further barred Ravnsborg from holding office in South Dakota. Republican Mark Vargo was appointed to fill the remainder of Ravnsborg's term and did not run for a full term.

Marty Jackley, who previously held this office from 2009 until 2019, ran unopposed in the general election.

Republican convention

Candidates

Nominated at convention
Marty Jackley, former South Dakota Attorney General (2009–2019)

Eliminated at convention
David Natvig, director of the South Dakota Division of Criminal Investigation and former Brule County State's Attorney

Barred from office
Jason Ravnsborg, former attorney general (2019–2022)

Endorsements

Polling

General election

Predictions

See also
South Dakota Attorney General

Notes

References

External links
Official campaign websites
Marty Jackley (R) for Attorney General

Attorney General
South Dakota
South Dakota Attorney General elections